Aleksei Stanislavovich Yeliseyev (born 13 July 1934) is a retired Soviet cosmonaut who flew on three missions in the Soyuz programme as a flight engineer: Soyuz 5 , Soyuz 8, and Soyuz 10. He made the world's eighth spacewalk during Soyuz 5 in 1969. 

Aleksei's father was Lithuanian with the last name Kuraitis, who died in the Soviet's Gulag as an enemy of the people. Aleksei uses his mother's last name "Yeliseyev" 
 so some regard him as also being a Lithuanian cosmonaut. 

A graduate of the Bauman Higher Technical School (1957) and postgraduate of Moscow Institute of Physics and Technology (1962). Yeliseyev worked as an engineer in Sergey Korolev's design bureau before being selected for cosmonaut training.

Following his retirement from the space programme in 1985, he took up at an administrative position at the Bauman school for several years before retiring fully.

Awards and honors

Soviet Union 

Twice Hero of the Soviet Union (22 January 969 and 22 October 1969)
Pilot-Cosmonaut of the USSR
Four Orders of Lenin (22 January 1969, 22 October 1969, 30 April 1971 and 15 January 1976)
Medal "For Merit in Space Exploration" (12 April 2011) – for the great achievements in the field of research, development and utilization of outer space, many years of diligent work, public activities
Jubilee Medal "In Commemoration of the 100th Anniversary since the Birth of Vladimir Il'ich Lenin"
State Prize of the USSR (3 November 1980)

Foreign states 

Hero of the People's Republic of Bulgaria
Order of Georgi Dimitrov (People's Republic of Bulgaria)

References

Literature 
 S. P. Korolev. Encyclopedia of life and creativity" – edited by C. A. Lopota, RSC Energia. S. P. Korolev, 2014 
The official website of the city administration Baikonur - Honorary citizens of Baikonur

1934 births
Living people
People from Kaluga Oblast
Moscow Institute of Physics and Technology alumni
1969 in spaceflight
1971 in spaceflight
Soviet cosmonauts
Lithuanian cosmonauts
Lithuanian astronauts
Heroes of the Soviet Union
Recipients of the Order of Lenin
Recipients of the USSR State Prize
Heroes of the People's Republic of Bulgaria
Recipients of the Order of Georgi Dimitrov
Soviet engineers
Bauman Moscow State Technical University alumni
Employees of RSC Energia
Spacewalkers